This is the list of the best-selling singles in 2012 in France. Rankings are based on the combined sales of physical and digital singles.

Top 200 singles

References

See also
2012 in music
List of number-one hits of 2012 (France)
List of top 10 singles in 2012 (France)

France
2012 in French music
French music-related lists